Wild Life is an American adult animated sitcom created by Adam Davies that premiered on September 26, 2020 on Syfy's late-night programming block, TZGZ. It is an animated show about a gang of zoo critters living free and hanging out after the end of the world. The season one finale aired on October 31.

Plot
Wild Life is "a show about animal friends just trying to stay alive after the apocalypse. Together, they come up with elaborate schemes to entertain themselves and pretty much just keep from going insane".

Cast and characters
 John Paul Reynolds as Glenn
 Claudia O'Doherty as Marny
 Baron Vaughn as Hudson
 Reggie Watts as Darby
 SkittLeZ Ortiz as Debbie
 Natalie Palamides as Viv

Episodes

Production

Development 
Wild Life was announced as part of the first efforts of Syfy to create original programming for its TZGZ block, with a 15-minute pilot ordered in January 2020. In April of the same year, the pilot was greenlit to series, with Syfy ordering five 15-minute episodes.

According to show creator Adam Davies, the idea, born in 2016, came from his love for animals, but also thinking there's a tension between them and humans, wanting to give them a voice because of that. The selection of animals as the main cast came when Davies started drawing cheetah spots to process trauma (which would become Glenn), with the rest of the cast and setting coming as a "subconscious thing".

Two inspirations for the show, according to executive producer Dylan Dawson, are comic strip Calvin and Hobbes and stop-motion series Creature Comforts.

Crew
The series is produced by Valparaiso Pictures, with animation outsourced to Octopie. According to executive producer Alex Plapinger, the number of people who worked on the show are between 40 and 50, with a lot of people working in various areas of production. The animation is done on Adobe Animate.

Cast
The main cast was announced the same day the pilot was greenlit to series, conformed by Natalie Palamides, Baron Vaughn, Reggie Watts, John Paul Reynolds, Claudia O'Doherty and SkittLeZ Ortiz.

Release
The first sneak peek of the show was released during Comic-Con on July 24, 2020, alongside a panel with members of the crew and cast. The series premiered on September 26, 2020, alongside the debut of Magical Girl Friendship Squad.

References

External links 
 

2020 American television series debuts
2020s American adult animated television series
2020s American animated comedy television series
2020s American sitcoms
Television series by Universal Television
Syfy original programming
TZGZ
American adult animated comedy television series
American flash adult animated television series
Animated adult television sitcoms
English-language television shows
American animated sitcoms
Animated television series about mammals